Danna C. Bell is an archivist and librarian at the Library of Congress. Bell served as president of the Society of American Archivists from 2013 to 2014 and serves on the Advisory Committee on the Records of Congress. Bell has been invited to many national and international events and conferences on archives and special collections, including the ARL/SAA Mosaic Program Leadership Forum in 2016. She is active in the archives profession and writes and speaks on the importance of archival work.

Education 
Bell earned her bachelor's in public administration and master's degree in college student personnel from Miami University, which she attended from 1978 to 1984. She has an MLIS from Long Island University.

Career 
In 1990, Bell began work at Marymount University as a reference librarian and coordinator. In 1993, she left Marymount and began her four-year service at the District of Columbia Public Library as an archivist. She served as the Curator of the National Equal Justice Library before becoming an Archival Consultant at American University's College of Law. In 1998, she moved to the Library of Congress, where she has worked in a number of roles. Most notably, she has served as a member of the Digital Reference Team and currently serves as the Educational Outreach Specialist. Her work has appeared in the Southern Poverty Law Center's Teaching Tolerance curriculum.

She has written several papers, essays and articles over her career and presented them at conferences of both the Society of American Archivists and the Mid-Atlantic Regional Archives Conference (MARAC). She is the production coordinator for the Teaching with the Library of Congress blog. Bell has served as a reviewer for the Library Journal, Educational Media Reviews Online, and the Public History Resource Center.

Bell has also served as a teacher and instructor. Through the Society of American Archivists (SAA), she teaches the course Real-World Reference: Moving Beyond Theory.

As President of the Society of American Archivists, she worked to include everyone. In an introduction, her mother, Marlyn Jews, said of Bell: "She worked to be inclusive in the development of goals and objectives for [the SAA]. And she championed those goals and objectives."

Affiliations 
Bell has been an active member of the Society of American Archivists throughout her career. She has served on and chaired numerous committees, including the Nominations and Elections Committees, as well as the SAA Council. From 2013 to 2014, she served as the 69th president of the Society.

Bell has also been heavily involved in the Mid-Atlantic Regional Archives Conference. Over the years, she has served and chaired on many committees, while also serving as Chair and President of MARAC from 2009 to 2011.

She has remained involved in community and church groups as well as local government. She has served in leadership positions in many other groups and organizations.

References 

21st-century African-American women writers
21st-century African-American writers
21st-century American historians
21st-century American women writers
African-American historians
African-American librarians
American archivists
American librarians
American women historians
American women librarians
Female archivists
Librarians at the Library of Congress
Living people
Long Island University alumni
Miami University alumni
Presidents of the Society of American Archivists
Year of birth missing (living people)